Howard Earl Greer (May 1, 1921 – November 22, 2015) was a vice admiral in the United States Navy.

He held a Master's Degree in Business Administration from George Washington University, and graduated from the United States Naval Academy in 1943, from the Naval War Command and Staff School in 1954, and from the Industrial College of the Armed Forces in 1961.

He then entered flight training and was designated a Naval Aviator in November, 1945. He then served aboard  from 1951-1952. He served with Fighter Squadrons Seventy-One, Sixty-Two, One Hundred One, and Attack Squadron Two Hundred Fourteen. Aboard  he commanded Fighter Squadron Sixy-Four from 1957-1958.

After this time he also served:

 As aide to the Deputy Chief of Naval Operations (Air)
 On the staff of the Chief of Naval Operations
 As Commander Fleet Air Jacksonville
 As Commander Sixth Fleet
 As Commander Naval Air Force Atlantic
 As Commander Carrier Division Seven
 As Commander Seventh Fleet

His awards include 2 Distinguished Service Medals, 4 Legions of Merit, the Navy Commendation Medal, Pacific Theater WW II Ribbon with 9 Battle Stars and the Vietnamese Distinguished Service Award. He died in 2015.

References

United States Navy vice admirals
1921 births
2015 deaths
People from Tyler, Texas
United States Naval Academy alumni
George Washington University alumni
United States Navy personnel of World War II